The Scout and Guide movement in Haiti is served by two organisations
 Association Nationale des Guides d'Haïti, member of the World Association of Girl Guides and Girl Scouts
 Scouts d'Haïti, member of the World Organization of the Scout Movement

See also